Short track speed skating at the 2012 Winter Youth Olympics was held at the Tyrolean Ice Arena in Innsbruck, Austria from 20 to 22 January. The difference in the Youth Olympic program for short track speed skating compared to the Winter Olympics, was that there was no 1500 metre event and no relay for each gender, instead a mixed NOC relay took place.

Medal summary

Medal table

Boys' events

Girls' events

Mixed

Qualification system
Each nation can send a maximum of four athletes (two boys and two girls). The top three athletes in the overall standings for both genders (three different NOCs) at the 2011 World Junior Short Track Speed Skating Championships are permitted to send two athletes per gender. The host nation is guaranteed one spot in each event. Finally the remaining spots will be distributed in the order of finish at the World Junior Short Track Speed Skating Championships up until the maximum quota is reached, with a limit of one athlete per NOC.

References 

 
2012 Winter Youth Olympics events
2012 in short track speed skating
2012